"Lonely Is the Night" is a song written and performed by American rock singer and guitarist Billy Squier. It appeared as the first track on side two of his triple-platinum 1981 album, Don't Say No and became an AOR (Album Oriented Rock) radio hit, reaching number 28 on Billboards Hot Mainstream Rock Tracks chart in 1981. Despite not seeing a proper single release (although it appeared on the B-side of UK pressings of his other hit "In the Dark") or a music video, the song is often considered one of his greatest. It appears in the video games Guitar Hero Encore: Rocks the 80's and Guitar Hero 5 as a playable track and in Grand Theft Auto V on the fictional radio station Los Santos Rock Radio.

In the Led Zeppelin biography, Hammer of the Gods, the song is mentioned, somewhat tongue-in-cheek, as one of the best singles Zeppelin ever put out, presumably for its similarity to another Led Zeppelin song. Although it doesn't specify what song that is, the song's tune is described as similar to "Nobody's Fault but Mine". Led Zeppelin had disbanded a year before the song's release due to drummer John Bonham's death.

Chart positions

References

Bibliography

 

1981 songs
Billy Squier songs
Songs written by Billy Squier
Song recordings produced by Reinhold Mack